Camilo Ponce Enríquez or Camilo Ponce may refer to:

 Camilo Ponce Enríquez (politician) (1912–1976), Ecuadorian politician
 Camilo Ponce (footballer) (born 1991), Chilean footballer
 Camilo Ponce Enríquez Canton, in Azuay province, Ecuador
 Camilo Ponce Enríquez (parish)
 Ciudad de Catamayo Airport, formerly Camilo Ponce Enriquez Airport, in Loja, Ecuador